Thomas de Zengotita (born  1944) is an author and contributing editor at Harper's Magazine. He holds a Ph.D. in anthropology from Columbia University and teaches at the Dalton School and New York University. His book Mediated: How the Media Shapes Your World and the Way You Live in It (2005) won the Marshall McLuhan award in 2006 and, in 2010. He co-wrote the narration for a film directed by Adrian Grenier entitled Teenage Paparazzo.  

His most recent book, Postmodern Theory and Progressive Politics: Toward New Humanism was published by Palgrave Macmillan in 2018. He is presently at work on a book called Toward a New Foundation for Human Rights: a Phenomenological Approach which is due out in 2020 from Stanford University Press.

De Zengotita graduated from Columbia University in 1973 and received his Ph.D. in 1992. At college, he was roommates with the paleontologist, Niles Eldredge, who proposed the theory of punctuated equilibrium in 1972, in Carman Hall.

References

External links
Interview with Raoul Heertje 
Review of Mediated by Peter Preston for The Guardian 
"Options, But Not Solutions" Interview by Williams Cole, The Brooklyn Rail (May 2005)
Wesch, Michael. "Michael Wesch - PdF2009 - The Machine is (Changing) Us The Machine is (Changing) Us. Google, Inc. Retrieved July 10, 2011.

Living people
1944 births
21st-century American non-fiction writers
American bloggers
American male bloggers
American philosophers
Harper's Magazine people
Columbia University School of General Studies alumni